Stockland Castle is the name given to two Iron Age hill forts on Stockland Hill close to Stockland in Devon, England.

References

Hill forts in Devon